G. Mohan Kumar (IAST: Ji Mohan Kumār; born 27 May 1955) is a retired 1979 batch IAS officer of Odisha cadre. He was the Defence Secretary of India from 2015 to 2017. He also served as the Defence Production Secretary of India and as the Steel Secretary of India.

Biography
Son of M. Gopinathan Nair, retired professor of NSS College Trivandrum, and Saradamma, Mohan Kumar studied at Government Model School Trivandrum during the 1960s, did his pre-degree at Arts College Trivandrum and BSc in Chemistry at University College Trivandrum. He was selected in the civil services while doing his MSc. Initially, he was selected in the IPS and in his next attempt, he was selected in the IAS cadre in 1979 and was allotted Odisha cadre.

Education
G. Mohan Kumar is a graduate (BSc) and a postgraduate (MSc) in Chemistry from University College. Mohan Kumar also has an MBA degree from the United Kingdom.

Career
During the course of his career, G. Mohan Kumar served in various key positions for both the Union Government and the Government of Odisha, like as Principal Secretary (Fisheries and Animal Resources Development), Commissioner of Commercial Taxes, Chairman and Managing Director of Odisha State Road Transport Corporation (OSRTC), Inspector General of Registrations, Managing Director of Odisha Small Industries Corporation (OSIC), Secretary to the Governor of Odisha, Chief Executive of Odisha Renewable Energy Development Authority, Managing Director of Odisha State Seeds Corporation (OSSC), and as the District Magistrate and Collector of Sambalpur district in the Odisha Government, and as the Union Defence Secretary, Union Defence Production Secretary, Union Steel Secretary, Special Secretary in the Ministry of Water Resources and as the Chairman of the Marine Products Export Development Authority in the Government of India.

Steel Secretary
G. Mohan Kumar was appointed as the Union Steel Secretary by the Appointments Committee of the Cabinet (ACC), he assumed office on 3 September 2013, and demitted it on 29 August 2014.

Defence Production Secretary
G. Mohan Kumar was appointed as the Union Defence Production Secretary by the Appointments Committee of the Cabinet (ACC), he assumed office on 1 September 2014, and demitted on 25 May 2015, when he was appointed as the Union Defence Secretary.

Defence Secretary
G. Mohan Kumar was appointed as the Union Defence Secretary by the Appointments Committee of the Cabinet (ACC) in May 2015, he assumed the office of Defence Secretary on 25 May 2015, and demitted it and simultaneously superannuated from service on 24 May 2017.

References

External links

 Executive Record Sheet as maintained by Department of Personnel and Training of Government of India

1955 births
Living people
Indian Administrative Service officers
Defence Secretaries of India
People from Thiruvananthapuram
People from Thiruvananthapuram district
District magistrate